Hayes Township is a township in Crawford County, Iowa, USA.  As of the 2000 census, its population was 274.

The township was named after Thomas Hayes Sr., a pioneer settler.

Geography
According to the USGS, it contains one cemeteries, Hayes Township Cemetery.

The stream of Malony Branch runs through this township.

Transportation
Hayes Township contains one airport or landing strip, Lenz Landing Strip.

References

 USGS Geographic Names Information System (GNIS)

External links
 US-Counties.com
 City-Data.com

Townships in Crawford County, Iowa
Townships in Iowa